Turn Back the Clock may refer to:

 Turn Back the Clock (album), an album by Johnny Hates Jazz
 "Turn Back the Clock", the title song from the album
 "Turn Back the Clock", a song from the album MK III by rock band Steam Powered Giraffe
 Turn Back the Clock (film), a 1933 comedy drama directed by Edgar Selwyn
 Turn Back the Clock (baseball), a Major League Baseball promotion
 Turn Back the Clock, a 1989 made for TV drama film starring Connie Sellecca